The 2007 European Youth Baseball Championship was an international baseball competition held in Jablonec, Czech Republic from July 17 to July 21, 2007. It featured teams from Austria, Belarus, Czech Republic, Germany, Netherlands, Poland, Russia and Slovakia.

In the end host Czech Republic won the tournament.

Group stage

Pool A

Standings

Game results

Pool B

Standings

Game results

Final round

Pool C

Standings

Game results

Semi-finals

3rd place

Final

Final standings

External links
Game Results

References

European Youth Baseball Championship
European Youth Baseball Championship
2007
2007 in Czech sport
European Youth Baseball Championship
European Youth Baseball Championship